The Sherbrooke Nature and Science Museum is a natural history and science museum in Sherbrooke, Quebec, Canada. It is located at 225 Frontenac Street in downtown Sherbrooke.

The museum receives funding from the City of Sherbrooke, the Quebec Ministry of Culture and Communications, the Department of Canadian Heritage as well as sponsorships, special grants and private funding.

History
In 1879, the Musée du Séminaire de Sherbrooke opened within the Séminaire de Sherbrooke on Marquette Street. The museum housed a collection of objects and specimens in the natural sciences. In the autumn of 2002 the museum began a major transformation, including its move to the Julius-Kayser Building, a  former lingerie factory.

Collection and exhibits
The museum's collection of over 65,000 objects and specimens represents the diversity of the fauna and flora of Quebec, Canada as well as elsewhere in North America and around the world. These items include, specimens of amphibians, reptiles and fish, archaeological items, 4,000 specimens of birds, 1,000 plant and animal fossils, 30,000 specimens of invertebrates, 500 specimens of mammals, 2,000 plants, 250 fungi, 4,000 rocks and minerals, as well as scientific instruments and other objects.

There is a permanent exhibition hall with an exhibit on the four seasons, as well as temporary exhibition halls, an interactive science theatre, a multi-functional hall, a relaxation area and a boutique.

References

External links
Official website

Museums in Estrie
Culture of Sherbrooke
Museums established in 2002
2002 establishments in Quebec
Natural history museums in Canada
Buildings and structures in Sherbrooke